Edith Bosch (born 31 May 1980) is a Dutch judoka.

Her Olympic debut was at the 2000 Olympics in Sydney where she finished seventh. She won the silver medal at the 2004 Summer Olympics in the middleweight division. She was also European champion that year. Bosch became world champion in the same 70 kg category at the 2005 World Judo Championships in Cairo, Egypt. At the 2008 Summer Olympics, she defeated Ronda Rousey in a quarter final match and won a bronze medal. In the 2012 Summer Olympics in London, she once again won the bronze medal.

Bosch has a HEAO diploma in commercial economy from Randstad Topsport Academy, she is also a master in Sport Management from Johan Cruyff Institute, and currently works as a team manager for the Nederlandse Spoorwegen.

During the 2012 Summer Olympics, Bosch was watching the final of the Men's 100 metres when a man threw a plastic bottle onto the track. Bosch punched the man, and he was detained by stewards.

Bosch retired from competitive judo in April 2013. She subsequently took up CrossFit.

In 2013, she appeared on Dutch reality TV programme Expeditie Robinson 2013, which she won. She lost  over the programme's month of production.

References 
 Dutch Olympic Committee

External links

  
 
 
 
 
 "Meet the last woman to defeat Ronda Rousey", Martin Rogers, USA Today, 9 November 2015

1980 births
Living people
Dutch female judoka
Olympic judoka of the Netherlands
Judoka at the 2000 Summer Olympics
Judoka at the 2004 Summer Olympics
Judoka at the 2008 Summer Olympics
Judoka at the 2012 Summer Olympics
Olympic bronze medalists for the Netherlands
Olympic silver medalists for the Netherlands
People from Den Helder
Olympic medalists in judo
Medalists at the 2012 Summer Olympics
Medalists at the 2008 Summer Olympics
Medalists at the 2004 Summer Olympics
Universiade medalists in judo
Universiade bronze medalists for the Netherlands
Sportspeople from North Holland
20th-century Dutch women
21st-century Dutch women